Rodulf was a Roman Catholic bishop and Norman kinsman of Edward the Confessor. After working as a missionary for Olaf II of Norway in Norway and maybe Iceland, he was appointed by Edward as an Abbot of Abingdon in 1051, but died in 1052 (Kelly 2000).

References
 Kelly, S. E. 2000. Charters of Abingdon, part 1. Anglo-Saxon Charters 7.

External links
 

Year of birth missing
1052 deaths
11th-century English Roman Catholic bishops
Abbots of Abingdon
Anglo-Normans